The Ayrault government was the 35th and 36th governments in the Fifth Republic of France, and headed by Jean-Marc Ayrault. The first Ayrault government was formed on 16 May 2012 by the presidential decree of President François Hollande. It was composed of members from the Socialist Party (30), the EELV (2) and the Radical Party of the Left (2). This was the first French government to respect gender equality, with equal male and female posts except the Prime Minister. It lasted one month, until the June legislative elections, after which Ayrault submitted his resignation.

Following the legislative defeat, President Hollande immediately charged him with forming a new government, under Article 8 of the French Constitution. The second Ayrault government (cabinet #36) began on 18 June 2012.

Following a landslide defeat in the French mayoral elections, the second Ayrault government was dissolved on 31 March 2014. Manuel Valls was chosen by Hollande to form the next cabinet.

Prime Minister

Ministers

Junior Ministers

Roster changes
On 19 March 2013, Jérôme Cahuzac, Minister for the Budget, resigned following the opening of a judicial inquiry into money laundering, known as the Cahuzac affair. He was succeeded by Bernard Cazeneuve.
On 2 July 2013, François Hollande terminated Delphine Batho, Minister for Ecology, Sustainable Development and Energy, after she gave an interview contesting the government's budget choices. She was replaced by Philippe Martin.

External links
Government website

References

François Hollande
2012 establishments in France
2014 disestablishments in France
Cabinets established in 2012
Cabinets disestablished in 2014
French governments